The 2015 Clipsal 500 Adelaide was a motor race for V8 Supercars held on the weekend of 27 February to 1 March 2015. The event was held at the Adelaide Street Circuit in Adelaide, South Australia, and consisted of two races of 125 kilometres and one race of 250 kilometres in length. It was the first event of fourteen in the 2015 International V8 Supercars Championship.

Chasing after his seventh V8 Supercar championship, Jamie Whincup made a great start by taking pole position for both Saturday races. The start of Race 1 was abandoned after Scott McLaughlin's car suffered an oil pump failure on the warm-up lap. The race eventually got under way and Whincup controlled the race to take the first win of 2015. Chaz Mostert and Fabian Coulthard finished second and third respectively after a safety car late in the race.

McLaughlin's day became even worse when he was deemed to have jumped the start in Race 2. After serving his ten-second penalty at the conclusion of his pit stop, a further ten seconds was added to McLaughlin's race time as he served the penalty during a safety car period. Mostert retired after hitting the wall at turn 8, while Whincup fell down the order due to a punctured tyre. Brad Jones Racing's Fabian Coulthard took the win, followed by James Courtney and Craig Lowndes.

Former V8 Supercar champion Marcos Ambrose stole the spotlight on Sunday by qualifying for the Top Ten Shootout. Courtney set the fastest time in the Shootout to score pole position for the 250 km Race 3. Courtney managed to convert his pole into a race win, his second Sunday race win in succession at the event. Teammate Garth Tander finished third, while Shane van Gisbergen finished second after a hard fought battle with Courtney. Whincup and Mostert were battling for fourth place on the final lap when they collided at Turn 10. Mostert spun into the wall and was collected by James Moffat with both failing to finish the race. Neither Mostert nor Whincup were penalised for the incident.

Courtney became the fifth driver in V8 Supercars to win two Clipsal 500 events and only the fourth to win two events in a row.

Results

Race 1

Qualifying

Race

Race 2

Qualifying

Race

Race 3

Qualifying

Top 10 Shootout

Race

Championship standings
 After Race 3 of 36

Drivers' Championship standings

Teams' Championship standings

 Note: Only the top five positions are included for both sets of standings.

Support races

Seven support series raced during the weekend, including the Australian debut of Robby Gordon's Stadium Super Trucks.

References

External links

Adelaide 500
Clipsal 500
March 2015 sports events in Australia
February 2015 sports events in Australia